In ophthalmology, accommodative excess (also known as excessive accommodation or accommodation excess) occurs when an individual uses more than normal accommodation (focusing on close objects) for performing certain near work.  Accommodative excess has traditionally been defined as accommodation that is persistently higher than expected for the patient's age. Modern definitions simply regard it as an inability to relax accommodation readily. Excessive accommodation is seen in association with excessive convergence also.

Symptoms and signs
 Blurring of vision due to pseudomyopia
 Headache
 Eye strain
 Asthenopia
 Trouble concentrating when reading

Causes

Causes related to refractive errors
Accommodative excess may be seen in the following conditions:
 Hypermetropia: Young hypermetropes use excessive accommodation as a physiological adaptation in the interest of clear vision.
 Myopia: Young myopes performing excessive near work may also use excessive accommodation in association with excessive convergence.
 Astigmatism: Astigmatic eye may also be associated with accommodative excess.
 Presbyopia: Early presbyopic eye may also induce excessive accommodation.
 Improper or ill fitting spectacles: Use of improper or ill fitting spectacles may also cause use of excessive accommodation.

Causes related to systemic drugs
Use of systemic drugs like Morphine, Digitalis, Sulfonamides, Carbonic anhydrase inhibitors may cause accommodative excess.

Causes related to diseases
Unilateral excessive accommodation-Trigeminal neuralgia, and head trauma may cause ciliary spasm and may cause accommodative excess.
Bilateral excessive accommodation-Diseases like Encephalitis, Syphilis, Head trauma, Influenza, Meningitis may cause ciliary spasm and bilateral excessive accommodation.

Secondary to Convergence insufficiency
Accommodative excess may occur secondary to convergence insufficiency also. In convergence insufficiency near point of convergence will recede, and positive fusional vergence (PFV) will reduce. So, the patient uses excessive accommodation to stimulate accommodative convergence to overcome reduced PFV.

Risk factors
A large amount of near work is the main precipitating factor of accommodative excess.

Pseudomyopia
Pseudomyopia also known as artificial myopia  refers to an intermittent and temporary shift in refractive error of the eye towards myopia. It may occur due to excessive accommodation or spasm of accommodation.

Diagnosis

Differential diagnosis
Parinaud’s syndrome, which can mimic some aspects of spasm of the near reflex, such as excessive accommodation and convergence; however, pupillary near-light dissociation, not miosis, is a feature of Parinaud’s syndrome.

Treatment
 Optical: Cycloplegic refraction, and correction of Refractive errors if any 
 Vision therapy
 General: Relax from near work

See also
 Spasm of accommodation
 Convergence excess

References

Disorders of ocular muscles, binocular movement, accommodation and refraction